The first season of the American drama television series 24, also known as Day 1, was first broadcast from November 6, 2001, to May 21, 2002, on Fox. The season's storyline starts at midnight and ends at the following midnight on the day of the California presidential primary.

Season overview
The first season takes place on the day of the California Presidential Primary.

The season's main plot revolves around an assassination attempt on David Palmer, a U.S. Senator from Maryland who is a candidate for the Democratic Party presidential nomination, on the day of the primary in California. The central character is Jack Bauer, a former United States Army Delta Force operator who is the Director of the fictional Counter Terrorist Unit (CTU) in Los Angeles. Bauer becomes professionally as well as personally involved when his wife Teri and daughter Kim are kidnapped by the people behind the assassination plot.

The season is divided into two halves; the first revolves around a mercenary group's efforts to control Jack Bauer by kidnapping his wife and daughter and forcing him to kill Senator Palmer. This culminates in Jack's successful rescue of his family. In the second half, a second wave of assassins is discovered. As CTU tracks their activities, Jack learns why he and the Senator are being targeted, and motions to counter against the assassins.

Fox initially ordered only 13 episodes—the successful rescue at the end of the season's first half was planned as a series finale in the event that the show was not renewed.

Major subplots
The show rotates between the points of view of each of the five main cast members: Jack Bauer, Teri Bauer, Nina Myers, Kim Bauer, and David Palmer, as well as one main villain—Mandy for the first three hours, followed by Ira Gaines, Andre Drazen, and finally Victor Drazen. The day's situations—both ongoing events and the relationships between these five characters and their associates—form the basis for the season's subplots.

 A mole at CTU is sabotaging efforts to stop the assassination.
 Jack finds himself in situations where he confronts his complex personal definition of compromise.
 Members of the Bauer family are rebuilding their relationships now that Jack has moved home after being separated from Teri for six months.
 There are tensions between Jack and two of his co-workers: Nina Myers and Tony Almeida. Nina is in a relationship with Tony but she was previously involved with Jack.
 Political scandals threaten to erupt when the press learns that Palmer's daughter had been raped seven years ago and that Palmer's son was accused of killing the rapist.
 Kim begins to have feelings for Rick Allen, even though he was originally hired to kidnap her.
 Teri develops personal problems as a result of the day's stress and revelations.
 After Sherry Palmer lies to her husband and tries to undermine his campaign, David Palmer realizes that she is only using their marriage to further her political ambitions.
 Jack endures personal anguish when he is forced to choose between protecting David Palmer and protecting his wife and daughter.

Summary
Season 1 starts and ends at 12:00 a.m. PST. The season's first half centers on the efforts of a terrorist cell led by Ira Gaines to assassinate presidential candidate David Palmer. They kidnap Jack Bauer's wife and daughter in order to force him to aid in the assassination and take the fall for Palmer's death. Jack eventually defeats this cell and Gaines in the process of saving his wife and daughter, but this only leads to information about a second group of terrorists who had employed the first cell. The second cell is led by those ultimately responsible for the day's events: Andre and Alexis Drazen.

Two years ago, to the day, Bauer was sent as part of a classified team to Kosovo on the orders of a secret U.S. Congressional panel headed by Palmer to kill Victor Drazen, Slobodan Milošević's "shadow." In order to keep Operation Nightfall totally secret, the panel never met nor knew the team of operatives, nor did the team know the panel. Therefore, Palmer and Bauer never knew about each other. The Drazens found out about both Palmer's and Bauer's involvement in the attack against their father and the death of his daughter and his wife. Incidentally, Bauer was believed to be the only operative still alive, and the whole assassination plot was to practice revenge: Palmer would be dead, Jack would be imprisoned for the assassination, and his family would be killed.

During the last few episodes, the plot twists revealed many surprises. It was revealed that Bauer's team had only killed Drazen's body double. Drazen's wife and daughter, however, were inadvertently killed, prompting the "eye for an eye" aspect of the plot: as Drazen's wife and daughter died, so would Bauer's wife and daughter. Viewers also discovered that the real Victor Drazen is a top secret, unofficial prisoner of the U.S. government, and the Drazens' primary goal was to free Victor Drazen.

Eventually, to satisfy the Drazens, Palmer's death is faked. The Drazens recapture Bauer's daughter Kim and offer to exchange her life for Bauer's. However, Kim escapes and the Drazens soon learn that Palmer is still alive. With time running out on his chance to escape before he is recaptured, in desperation, the freed Victor Drazen tells his mole inside CTU, who is revealed to be Nina Myers, to call Bauer and tell him that his daughter is dead and that the U.S. Coast Guard has found her body. Drazen knows that a grieving Jack will attack him, and he believes he, his son Andre Drazen (the other, Alexis, having been seriously injured earlier by an aide to Sen. Palmer and later dying of his wounds during transportation to the Drazen hideout) and their henchmen can kill Jack. Nina is reluctant, knowing that if Drazen's plan fails, Jack will very quickly learn that Kim is not dead and that, since Nina lied to him, she must be the mole. However Nina does tell this lie to Jack.

Drazen's plot backfires rather spectacularly, as an enraged Jack kills Drazen's son and guards, and in the process corners Victor Drazen before killing him, after both have exchanged fire in a shootout. Afterwards, Jack Bauer speaks with a member of the Coast Guard to arrange to claim his daughter's body. The Coast Guard informs Bauer that they did not find a body that night. Bauer realizes that Nina Myers is the mole. He calls George Mason and tells him to detain Myers, but Myers, who heard that Bauer had survived, was already preparing for exfiltration by erasing all the incriminating information of herself on CTU's computer. Bauer's wife, Teri, is confused about the events surrounding Jack's attempt to rescue their daughter, and looks for Myers, whom she trusts. Teri realizes that Myers is the mole, however, and Myers ties her to a chair. Jack comes to CTU and lets the agents take Myers into custody (as opposed to killing her). He then discovers his wife's body in the chair with a fatal gunshot wound to her abdomen. The season ends with Jack cradling his dead wife in his arms, while he constantly tells her he is sorry.

Characters

Starring
 Kiefer Sutherland as Jack Bauer (24 episodes)
 Leslie Hope as Teri Bauer (24 episodes)
 Sarah Clarke as Nina Myers (24 episodes)
 Elisha Cuthbert as Kim Bauer (24 episodes)
 Dennis Haysbert as Senator David Palmer (24 episodes)

Special guest stars
 Carlos Bernard as Tony Almeida (23 episodes)
 Penny Johnson Jerald as Sherry Palmer (22 episodes)
 Richard Burgi as Kevin Carroll (11 episodes)
 Dennis Hopper as Victor Drazen (5 episodes)
 Lou Diamond Phillips as Mark DeSalvo (2 episodes)

Guest starring

Episodes

Production
The first season introduced split screens into 24, a feature which continued to play a role in all of the seasons, especially the early ones. Editors originally wanted the boxes showing separate characters to overlap but Stephen Hopkins decided not to do this. The writers were intentionally secretive about whether Teri Bauer would be killed in the final episode. To cast doubt about the outcome, three endings were filmed, two of which showed that Teri survived. Writers Joel Surnow and Robert Cochran originally planned for Teri to survive, but half-way through the season, they decided that a happy ending would not be as satisfying. They instead went with the ending where Teri dies. Surnow explained, "It made the show feel more real. And it gives our audience a sense when they're going to watch the show next season, of not being able to expect anything they’ve come to expect in a normal television show."

Trailer
The trailer for the first season aired some time between April and November, 2001. The trailer announces that David Palmer may become the first black U.S. President and shows Jack Bauer learning about the assassination attempt and corruption within his agency. Notably, the trailer shows the explosion of a commercial plane that was edited out of the show in response to the September 11 attacks. All other scenes shown are from the premiere episode.

Reception
The first season received universal acclaim, scoring a Metacritic rating of 88/100 based on 27 reviews. On Rotten Tomatoes, the season has an approval rating of 95% with an average score of 8.7 out of 10 based on 21 reviews. The website's critical consensus reads, "Brimming with tension and political intrigue, 24 successfully introduces its unique, high-concept format and a compelling hero worth watching in Kiefer Sutherland's Jack Bauer."

Kiefer Sutherland won the Golden Globe Award for Best Actor – Television Series Drama and the Satellite Award for Best Actor – Television Series Drama for his role as Jack Bauer for this season. In 2009, the season finale ("11:00 p.m. – 12:00 a.m.") was listed in TV Guides list of the top 100 episodes of all time, at number 10. In 2005, TV Land included the same episode as part of its "100 Most Unexpected Moments in TV History", ranking it number 32. Teri Bauer's death at the end of the finale was voted by TV Guide as the second-most shocking death in television history.

Award nominations

Home media releases
The season 1 DVD features an alternative ending in which Teri Bauer survives.

References

External links
 

24 (TV series)
2001 American television seasons
2002 American television seasons
Works about the Serbian Mafia